Lüganuse is a small borough in Ida-Viru County, northern Estonia. It is the administrative centre of Lüganuse Parish. As of 2011 Census, the settlement's population was 439, of which the Estonians were 423 (96.4%).

References

External links
Lüganuse Parish 

Boroughs and small boroughs in Estonia
Lüganuse Parish
Kreis Wierland